Fascicle or fasciculus may refer to:

Anatomy and histology 
 Muscle fascicle, a bundle of skeletal muscle fibers
 Nerve fascicle, a bundle of axons (nerve fibers)
 Superior longitudinal fasciculus
 Arcuate fasciculus
  Gracile fasciculus
  Cuneate fasciculus
 Dorsal longitudinal fasciculus
 Medial longitudinal fasciculus
 Flechsig's fasciculus
Fascicular pattern of histopathologic architecture

Botany 
 Fascicle (botany), a cluster of flowers or leaves, such as the bundles of the thin leaves (or needles) of pines
 A discrete bundle of vascular tissue

Other uses 
 Fasciculus, a fossil comb jelly
 Fasciculus Chemicus, a 17th-century anthology of alchemical writings
 Fascicle (book), a discrete section of a larger book or other published work issued in serial form